Edie Brickell & New Bohemians is an alternative rock jam band that originated in Dallas, Texas, in the mid-1980s.  The band is widely known for their 1988 hit "What I Am" from the album Shooting Rubberbands at the Stars. Their music contains elements of rock, folk, blues, and jazz. Following the 1990 release of their second album Ghost of a Dog, lead singer Edie Brickell left the band and married singer-songwriter Paul Simon.  In 2006, she and the band launched a new web site and released a new album, Stranger Things.

History

Early years and beginnings 
New Bohemians started as a trio in the early 1980s, gaining experience in the Deep Ellum neighborhood of downtown Dallas, Texas. The original line-up featured Brad Houser on vibraslap, Eric Presswood on guitar, and Brandon Aly on drums.

Drummer Aly, guitarist Kenny Withrow, and percussionist John Bush went to the same arts magnet high school in Dallas: Booker T. Washington High School for the Performing and Visual Arts. Singer Edie Brickell also went to this school, however the other members of the band didn't know her until later, and according to Houser, Edie was there for art. Houser attended Hillcrest High School and lived in the same neighborhood as other band members. He played in various neighborhood bands like The Knobs which included Kenny Withrow, and was also in the Munch Puppies.

The additional core members joined in 1985. Edie became the singer after being encouraged to join the band onstage during a show. It was soon after such first show that a local agent who was booking bands at Rick's Casablanca was brought to hear the band. The band signed a six-month management contract which brought with it better paying gigs at Rick's. When the six months ended, they started regular gigging in the Deep Ellum neighborhood of the city. Presswood left and Kenny Withrow joined as guitarist, playing his first show in July 1985 at the Starck Club in Dallas. John Bush joined on percussion in September of that year: his first show with the band was September 12, 1985, at Poor David's Pub in Dallas, when the band was backing Bo Diddley.

New Bos, the name the band assumed then, were a local favorite, packing in the fans at now-famous Deep Ellum venues such as "Theater Gallery", "500 Cafe", and "Club Dada". They were also regular performers at the annual Fry Street Fair on the University of North Texas campus in Denton, Texas. During this period of the band history, Edie's name was not used in that of the band.

Release of the albums and the successful first one 
Their debut album, Shooting Rubberbands at the Stars, was released in 1988, was a commercial success, and produced the US top 10 hit "What I Am". The following album, Ghost of a Dog, was released in 1990, and was less successful; soon after the album's release, New Bohemians disbanded. In the mid-1990s Brickell, Bush and Withrow gave birth to The Slip, a side project. 

Later in the years, New Bohemians also released compilations and a live album, as well as continuing to record further studio albums: in 2006, indeed, current members reunited to record and tour with the release of the album Stranger Things, occurred on July 25 that year. On September 3, 2007 the group mourned the murder of band member Carter Albrecht, who was killed in Dallas that day. 

On October 12, 2018 the band released the album Rocket. On February 19, 2021, the band released the third album after the reunion, Hunter and the Dog Star.

Live shows and concerts 
The band played live at the "North Oak Cliff Music Festival" in October 2014 with the current lineup as well as keyboardist and multi-instrumentalist Matt Hubbard. The band reunited again in April 2017 with three concerts at the "Kessler Theater" in "Oak Cliff".

Use of the band songs in the media 
The band's song "Circle" appeared on an episode of Cold Case, Ugly Betty, and Wet Hot American Summer: 10 Years Later, and in 2013 it was covered by the pop punk band Bowling for Soup on the album Lunch. Drunk. Love..

Members

Current members
 Brandon Aly – drums
 Edie Brickell – vocals, guitar
 John Walter Bush – percussion
 John Bradley Houser – bass guitar, woodwinds
 Kenneth Neil Withrow – guitar

Previous members
 Carter Albrecht – keyboards, electric guitar, harmonica, vocals (died 2007)
 Wes Burt-Martin – guitar
 Matt Chamberlain – drums
 Eric Presswood – guitar
 Chris Wheatley – keyboards
 Chris Whitten – drums
 Paul "Wix" Wickens – keyboards

Discography

Albums

Studio albums

Live albums

Compilation albums

Singles

Awards and nominations
{| class=wikitable
|-
! Year !! Awards !! Work !! Category !! Result
|-
| 1988
| Billboard Music Awards
| "What I Am"
| Top Modern Rock Track 
| 
|-
| rowspan=4|1989
| International Rock Awards
| Themselves 
| Newcomer of the Year 
| 
|-
| rowspan=2|Pollstar Concert Industry Awards
| rowspan=2|Tour
| Small Hall Tour of the Year
| 
|-
| Best Debut Tour
| 
|-
| rowspan=1|MTV Video Music Awards
| "What I Am"
| Best New Artist
| 
|-
| rowspan=2|1990
| ASCAP Pop Music Awards
| "What I Am"
| Most Performed Song
| 
|-
| MTV Video Music Awards
| "A Hard Rain's a-Gonna Fall"
| Best Video from a Film
| 
|-
| 1991
| MTV Video Music Awards
| "Mama Help Me" 
| Best Art Direction
|

References

External links
Brandon Aly's official website
John Bush's official website
New Bohemians Live Music Archive at archive.org
What They Were – Article from Dallas Observer, 1998
History of Deep Ellum – Dallas Observer, 1999

 
American alternative rock groups
American folk rock groups
Neo-psychedelia groups
American southern rock musical groups
Jam bands
Musical groups from Dallas
Musical groups established in 1985
Musical groups disestablished in 1991
Musical groups reestablished in 1997
1985 establishments in Texas
Edie Brickell
Female-fronted musical groups
Thirty Tigers artists